Pia Dijkstra (born 9 December 1954 in Franeker) is a Dutch politician and chair of the Standing Committee on Foreign Affairs of the Dutch House of Representatives. Ms Dijkstra is a member of Democrats 66 (D66) and has been an MP since 17 June 2010.

Before she was elected to parliament, she was a television (news) presenter. From 1988 to 2000 she was news anchor of the main Dutch public news broadcaster NOS Journaal.

References 
  Parlement.com biography

External links 

  House of Representatives biography

1954 births
Living people
Democrats 66 politicians
Dutch television news presenters
Dutch reporters and correspondents
Members of the House of Representatives (Netherlands)
People from Franekeradeel
Protestant Church Christians from the Netherlands
21st-century Dutch politicians
21st-century Dutch women politicians
Women television journalists